The Men's 4 × 50 metre medley relay competition of the 2021 FINA World Swimming Championships (25 m) was held on 20 December 2021.

Records
Prior to the competition, the existing world and championship records were as follows.

The following new records were set during this competition:

Results

Heats
The heats were started at 09:30.

Final
The final was held at 18:00.

References

Men's 4 x 50 metre medley relay